Penny Dreadful is a British-American horror drama television series created and written by John Logan, who serves as executive producer alongside Sam Mendes. The title refers to the penny dreadfuls, a type of 19th-century cheap British fiction publication with lurid and sensational subject matter. The series premiered on Showtime on May 11, 2014. After the third-season finale on June 19, 2016, series creator John Logan announced that Penny Dreadful had ended. 

The series draws upon many public domain characters from 19th-century British and Irish fiction, including Dorian Gray from Oscar Wilde's The Picture of Dorian Gray; Mina Harker, Abraham Van Helsing, Dr. Seward, Renfield, and Count Dracula from Bram Stoker's Dracula; Victor Frankenstein and his creature from Mary Shelley's Frankenstein; and Dr. Henry Jekyll from Robert Louis Stevenson's Strange Case of Dr Jekyll and Mr Hyde.

Series overview

Episodes

Season 1 (2014)

Season 2 (2015)

Season 3 (2016)

Ratings

References

External links 

Lists of American drama television series episodes
Lists of British drama television series episodes